Seyidli Mosque is an Azerbaijani mosque located in Shusha, Azerbaijan about 350 km from the capital Baku. The mosque is located on intersection of Telman and Garyaghdyogly streets.

About 
The mosque is located approximately 350 km from the capital Baku. The mosque is located at the intersection of Telman and Garyagdioglu streets in Shusha city. The mosque is built on two floors. Seyidli mosque is believed to have been built in the 18th century. During the 30-year Armenian occupation, the mosque suffered considerable damage.

Architectural style 
The mosque is located in Seyidli neighborhood on Cıdır road. This small neighborhood mosque is almost indistinguishable from other mosques in its current state and resembles local residential properties. The prayer hall of the mosque, which has a rectangular shape, does not have a three-bay division like the Mamay or Saatli mosques. The mosque is located in Seyidli neighborhood on Cıdır road. This small neighborhood mosque is almost indistinguishable from other mosques in its current state and resembles local residential properties. The prayer hall of the mosque, which has a rectangular shape, does not have a three-bay division like the Mamay or Saatli mosques.

References

External links

Karabakh Monuments

Mosques in Shusha
17th-century mosques